Freycinetia excelsa is a species of climbing plant in the family Pandanaceae. Naturally found growing in northern and eastern Australia, as far south as the Tweed Valley in New South Wales.

References

excelsa
Flora of New South Wales
Flora of Queensland
Flora of the Northern Territory